Roy Nelson (born June 20, 1976) is a retired American mixed martial artist who competed in the Heavyweight division. A professional competitor from 2004 to 2020, he competed for the UFC, EliteXC, the IFL, BodogFIGHT, and most recently for Bellator MMA. In the UFC, Nelson was the winner of The Ultimate Fighter: Heavyweights and achieved success as a top 10 UFC Heavyweight. Nelson is also the former IFL Heavyweight Champion, competing under Ken Shamrock and the Lion's Den. He holds notable victories over Mirko Cro Cop, Cheick Kongo, and Antônio Rodrigo Nogueira.

Background
Nelson was born and raised in Las Vegas, Nevada and attended Cimarron-Memorial High School, where he competed in wrestling, football, and baseball. Nelson briefly trained in karate and began training in Ark Wong's Ng Ga Kuen Shaolin Kung Fu when he was 15 years old. Nelson worked briefly as a warehouse worker in 1999. Nelson originally began training in Brazilian jiu-jitsu under UFC veteran John Lewis in 2000. After seven years working as a substitute teacher and after-school program volunteer in Clark County, Nelson began his own career in mixed martial arts. Nelson has been a long-time student of Brazilian jiu-jitsu master Renzo Gracie, who granted him a black belt on August 26, 2009. Nelson was known initially for his strong Jiu-Jitsu game, and has competed at the Abu Dhabi Grappling Championships.

Mixed martial arts career

Early career
Prior to Nelson's professional mixed martial arts career, he played rugby for the Las Vegas Blackjacks for two seasons (2002–2003).

Nelson made his professional mixed martial arts debut at a tournament on April 17, 2004. Nelson won both of his fights, winning the Rage on the River Heavyweight Tournament. Nelson compiled a record of 6–1 before being signed by the IFL.

IFL
As a member of Ken Shamrock's Lion's Den, Nelson was asked to become a member of the IFL's Nevada Lions in 2007, and made his promotional debut at IFL: Oakland on January 19, 2007 against veteran Vince Lucero. Nelson won via TKO in the first round.

In the 2007 IFL World Grand Prix, Nelson became the Heavyweight Champion, defeating Antoine Jaoude on December 29, 2007. Nelson successfully defended his title twice, before the IFL ceased operations.

Post-IFL
After the IFL ceased operations Nelson took a fight with EliteXC on 10 days' notice against former UFC Heavyweight Champion Andrei Arlovski. Roy Nelson lost via KO in the second round; however, controversy broke out over Nelson being stood up by the referee in the first round from side control, while staying active and working on a kimura.
He then went on to fight for Roy Jones Jr.'s Square Ring Promotions against Jeff Monson. This fight also ended in a controversial loss for Nelson. According to the TV commentators and most MMA media, Nelson won the bout. However, Monson was awarded a unanimous decision.

The Ultimate Fighter
Nelson was one of the sixteen fighters in The Ultimate Fighter: Heavyweights. He provided commentary on the show for multiple websites, including weekly Q&A sessions about each individual episode for USA Today's Fighting Stances and a blog for SpikeTV.com.
In his first fight of the show, Nelson defeated former street-fighter Kimbo Slice via TKO stoppage in the second round with repeated punches to the head in the crucifix position. The broadcast was the highest rated MMA show in U.S. history with a 3.7 rating. The fight itself had 6 million viewers.

In the quarterfinals, Nelson defeated Justin Wren in a two-round majority decision. In the semi-finals, Nelson defeated James McSweeney via strikes in the first round again utilizing the crucifix position. He defeated Brendan Schaub at The Ultimate Fighter: Heavyweights Finale to become the winner of The Ultimate Fighter: Heavyweights. In the finale, Nelson knocked out Schaub at 3:45 into the first round with a right hook to Schaub's left temple and then hit Schaub on the ground with one punch to the face before the referee pulled Nelson off Schaub. With the win, Nelson earned a six-figure contract with the UFC.

Ultimate Fighting Championship
Nelson was scheduled to fight Cheick Kongo, though the bout was cancelled after Kongo withdrew. Nelson instead faced Junior dos Santos at UFC 117 in a bout to determine the #1 contender (after Cain Velasquez) to the UFC Heavyweight Championship. Nelson lost by unanimous decision, but was able to withstand the varied attacks of dos Santos, as he was becoming the first man to take dos Santos to a decision. Nelson was scheduled to face Shane Carwin at UFC 125. Carwin, however, had to pull out of the fight due to a back injury. Nelson was pulled off the card altogether.

On November 14, 2010, UFC President Dana White announced that Nelson's UFC career would be on hold due to Nelson being contractually bound to another fight promotion. White declined to specifically name the promotion, but sources close to Nelson confirmed that Roy Jones Jr.'s Square Ring Promotions claimed to have Nelson tied down. Nelson stated on The MMA Hour with Ariel Helwani that this is old news and that he is still able to fight in the UFC with no problems.

Nelson faced Frank Mir on May 28, 2011, at UFC 130 and lost by unanimous decision. UFC president Dana White criticized Nelson's performance after the fight for Nelson's lack of conditioning. Nelson blamed a bout with the flu for his poor performance. Nelson indicated that he has plans of cutting weight and fighting in the light heavyweight division at some point in the future.

Nelson faced Mirko Cro Cop on October 29, 2011 at UFC 137 and won by TKO in the third round.

Nelson next fought the returning Fabrício Werdum at UFC 143 on February 4, 2012. He lost the fight via unanimous decision. The back and forth action earned  Fight of the Night honors.

Nelson was scheduled to face Antônio Silva on May 26, 2012 at UFC 146, but Silva was moved up to fight Cain Velasquez. Nelson was then briefly expected to face Gabriel Gonzaga. However, Gonzaga himself was forced out of the bout with an injury and replaced by Dave Herman, who Nelson knocked out in 51 seconds. He earned Knockout of the Night honors due to his performance. Joe Rogan said on the live broadcast that "When Herman sat down on his ass, he had no idea where he was".

It was announced on July 12, 2012 that Nelson would be coaching on the show, The Ultimate Fighter, against fellow heavyweight Shane Carwin, with the two expected to face each other on December 15, 2012 at The Ultimate Fighter: Team Carwin vs. Team Nelson Finale. On November 14, it was announced that Shane Carwin injured his knee and wouldn't be able to fight. On November 15, it was reported that Nelson would face Matt Mitrione at the TUF 16 Finale. Nelson defeated Mitrione via first-round TKO.

Nelson faced Cheick Kongo on April 27, 2013 at UFC 159. Nelson won the fight by knockout at 2:03 of the first round. The win also won him his fourth Knockout of the Night bonus award.

Nelson faced Stipe Miocic on June 15, 2013 at UFC 161. Miocic defeated Nelson via unanimous decision. There was speculation about his MMA future because his contract was expiring, but Nelson renewed it soon after.

Nelson faced Daniel Cormier on October 19, 2013 at UFC 166. He lost the fight via unanimous decision.

Nelson faced Antônio Rodrigo Nogueira on April 11, 2014 in the main event at UFC Fight Night 39. After dropping Nogueira several times with punches in the first round, Nelson finished the fight via knockout with an overhand right. The win also earned Nelson his first Performance of the Night bonus award. Nelson broke his right hand during the fight for which he required surgery in order to repair.

Nelson next faced Mark Hunt on September 20, 2014, in the main event at UFC Fight Night 52. Nelson lost the fight via knockout in the second round. It was his first loss by knockout and his first finished fight outside round 1 in a scheduled 5-round fight.

Nelson faced Alistair Overeem on March 14, 2015 at UFC 185. He lost the fight by unanimous decision.

After working as a coach on Road to UFC Japan, Nelson faced Josh Barnett on September 27, 2015 in the main event at UFC Fight Night 75. He lost the fight via unanimous decision.

Nelson faced Jared Rosholt on February 6, 2016 at UFC Fight Night 82. He won the fight by unanimous decision (30–27, 30–27, and 29–28).

Nelson faced Derrick Lewis on July 7, 2016 at UFC Fight Night 90 Even though breaking his personal record of most takedowns in a fight with 7, Nelson lost via split decision.

Nelson faced Antônio Silva on September 24, 2016 at UFC Fight Night 95. He won the fight by knockout in the second round. After the fight, out of frustration with what he thought was a late stoppage, Nelson push-kicked referee John McCarthy.

Nelson faced Alexander Volkov on April 15, 2017 at UFC on Fox 24. He lost the fight by unanimous decision.

Bellator MMA
In May 2017, it was announced that Nelson's contract with the UFC had expired in April and that he had a signed multi-fight contract with Bellator MMA.

In his debut Nelson faced Javy Ayala at Bellator 183 on September 23, 2017. He won the fight by unanimous decision in what was his first non-UFC related match in nearly 8 years.

Nelson faced Matt Mitrione in the quarterfinal round of the Bellator Heavyweight World Grand Prix Tournament at Bellator 194 on February 16, 2018. He lost the fight via majority decision.

Nelson was expected to face Mirko Cro Cop in a rematch at Bellator 200 on May 25, 2018. However, the bout was scrapped during the week leading up to the event as Cro Cop pulled out of the fight citing an injury.

Nelson faced Sergei Kharitonov in the Bellator 207 co-main event on October 12, 2018. He lost the fight via knockout in round one.

The rematch against Mirko Cro Cop eventually took place on February 16, 2019 at Bellator 216. Nelson lost the fight by unanimous decision.

Nelson faced Valentin Moldavsky at Bellator 244 on August 21, 2020. He lost the fight by unanimous decision.

On October 27, 2020, it was revealed that Nelson had been released from his Bellator MMA contract.

Fighting style
Despite possessing a black belt in Brazilian Jiu-Jitsu, later years saw Nelson develop a reputation for his powerful striking game, specifically his signature overhand-right.

Nelson is also known for having an iron chin. In fact, after his bout against fellow heavyweight Stipe Miocic at UFC 161, Nelson had broken the record for the amount of significant strikes absorbed by a fighter without being knocked out, receiving 437 strikes across his then 10-fight UFC career.

Personal life
Nelson is married to Jess Nelson and they have a son. Nelson's nickname 'Big Country' originates from his early years in MMA, when his training partners thought Nelson was from some remarkable wrestling state like Iowa or Oklahoma because of his wrestling pedigree.

Championships and accomplishments

Mixed martial arts
Ultimate Fighting Championship
The Ultimate Fighter: Heavyweights Tournament Winner
Fight of the Night (One time)
Knockout of the Night (Four times)
Performance of the Night (One time)
International Fight League
IFL Heavyweight Championship (One time; first; last)
IFL 2007 Heavyweight Grand Prix Champion
Most consecutive title defenses in the Heavyweight division (2)
Tied (Ryan Schultz) for most consecutive title defenses in the IFL (2)
Tied (Ryan Schultz) for most title defenses in the IFL (2)
Rage on the River
Rage on the River Heavyweight Tournament Winner

Submission grappling
Abu Dhabi Combat Club
2003 ADCC Submission Wrestling World Championships Quarterfinalist
Pan-American Championship Jiu Jitsu
2005 Brown Belt (+100 kg): 1st Place
2003 Brown Belt (+100 kg): 3rd Place
Grapplers Quest
2003 Grapplers Quest Superfight Champion

Mixed martial arts record

|-
|Loss
|align=center|23–19
|Valentin Moldavsky
|Decision (unanimous)
|Bellator 244 
|
|align=center|3
|align=center|5:00
|Uncasville, Connecticut, United States 
|
|-
|Loss
|align=center|23–18
|Frank Mir
|Decision (unanimous) 
|Bellator 231
|
|align=center|3
|align=center|5:00
|Uncasville, Connecticut, United States
|
|-
|Loss
|align=center|23–17
|Mirko Cro Cop
|Decision (unanimous)
|Bellator 216
|
|align=center|3
|align=center|5:00
|Uncasville, Connecticut, United States
|
|-
|Loss
|align=center|23–16
|Sergei Kharitonov
|KO (punches and knee)
|Bellator 207
|
|align=center|1
|align=center|4:59
|Uncasville, Connecticut, United States
|
|-
|Loss
|align=center|23–15
|Matt Mitrione
|Decision (majority)
|Bellator 194
|
|align=center|3
|align=center|5:00
|Uncasville, Connecticut, United States
|
|-
|Win
|align=center|23–14
|Javy Ayala
|Decision (unanimous)
|Bellator 183
|
|align=center|3
|align=center|5:00
|San Jose, California, United States
|
|-
|Loss
|align=center|22–14
|Alexander Volkov
|Decision (unanimous)
|UFC on Fox: Johnson vs. Reis
|
|align=center|3
|align=center|5:00
|Kansas City, Missouri, United States
|
|-
|Win
|align=center|22–13 
|Antônio Silva
| KO (punches)
|UFC Fight Night: Cyborg vs. Länsberg
|
|align=center|2 
|align=center|4:10
|Brasília, Brazil
|  
|-
|Loss
|align=center|21–13
|Derrick Lewis
| Decision (split)
|UFC Fight Night: dos Anjos vs. Alvarez
|
|align=center|3
|align=center|5:00
|Las Vegas, Nevada, United States
|  
|-
|Win
|align=center|21–12
|Jared Rosholt
|Decision (unanimous)
|UFC Fight Night: Hendricks vs. Thompson
|
|align=center|3
|align=center|5:00
|Las Vegas, Nevada, United States
|  
|-
|Loss
| align=center| 20–12
|Josh Barnett
|Decision (unanimous)
|UFC Fight Night: Barnett vs. Nelson
|
|align=center|5
|align=center|5:00
|Saitama, Japan
|
|-
| Loss
|align=center| 20–11
| Alistair Overeem
|Decision (unanimous)
|UFC 185
|
|align=center|3
|align=center|5:00
|Dallas, Texas, United States
|
|-
| Loss
|align=center| 20–10
| Mark Hunt
| KO (punch)
| UFC Fight Night: Hunt vs. Nelson
| 
|align=center|2
|align=center|3:00
| Saitama, Japan
| 
|-
| Win
|align=center| 20–9
| Antônio Rodrigo Nogueira
| KO (punch)
| UFC Fight Night: Nogueira vs. Nelson
| 
|align=center|1
|align=center|3:37
| Abu Dhabi, United Arab Emirates
| 
|-
| Loss
|align=center| 19–9
| Daniel Cormier
| Decision (unanimous)
| UFC 166
| 
|align=center|3
|align=center|5:00 
| Houston, Texas, United States
|
|-
| Loss
|align=center| 19–8
| Stipe Miocic
| Decision (unanimous)
| UFC 161
| 
|align=center|3
|align=center|5:00
| Winnipeg, Manitoba, Canada
| 
|-
| Win
|align=center| 19–7
| Cheick Kongo
|KO (punches)
| UFC 159
| 
|align=center|1
|align=center|2:03
| Newark, New Jersey, United States
| 
|-
| Win
|align=center| 18–7
| Matt Mitrione
| TKO (punches)
| The Ultimate Fighter: Team Carwin vs. Team Nelson Finale
| 
|align=center|1
|align=center|2:58
| Las Vegas, Nevada, United States
|
|-
| Win
|align=center| 17–7
| Dave Herman
|KO (punch)
| UFC 146
| 
|align=center|1
|align=center|0:51
| Las Vegas, Nevada, United States
| 
|-
| Loss
|align=center| 16–7
| Fabrício Werdum
|Decision (unanimous)
| UFC 143
| 
|align=center|3
|align=center|5:00
| Las Vegas, Nevada, United States
| 
|-
| Win
|align=center| 16–6
| Mirko Cro Cop
|TKO (punches)
| UFC 137
| 
|align=center| 3
|align=center| 1:30
| Las Vegas, Nevada, United States
|
|-
| Loss
|align=center| 15–6
| Frank Mir
|Decision (unanimous)
| UFC 130
| 
|align=center| 3
|align=center| 5:00
| Las Vegas, Nevada, United States
| 
|-
| Loss
|align=center| 15–5
| Junior dos Santos
| Decision (unanimous)
| UFC 117
| 
|align=center| 3
|align=center| 5:00
| Oakland, California, United States
| 
|-
| Win
|align=center| 15–4
| Stefan Struve
| TKO (punches)
| UFC Fight Night: Florian vs. Gomi
| 
|align=center| 1
|align=center| 0:39
| Charlotte, North Carolina, United States
| 
|-
| Win
|align=center| 14–4
| Brendan Schaub
| KO (punch)
| The Ultimate Fighter: Heavyweights Finale
| 
|align=center| 1
|align=center| 3:45
|Las Vegas, Nevada, United States
| 
|-
| Loss
|align=center| 13–4
|Jeff Monson
| Decision (unanimous)
| SRP: March Badness
| 
|align=center| 3
|align=center| 5:00
| Pensacola, Florida, United States
| 
|-
| Loss
|align=center| 13–3
| Andrei Arlovski
| KO (punch)
| EliteXC: Heat
| 
|align=center| 2
|align=center| 3:14
| Sunrise, Florida, United States
| 
|-
| Win
|align=center| 13–2
| Brad Imes
| KO (punch)
| IFL: Connecticut
| 
|align=center| 1
|align=center|3:55
| Uncasville, Connecticut, United States
| 
|-
| Win
|align=center| 12–2
|Fabiano Scherner
| TKO (punches)
| IFL: Las Vegas
| 
|align=center| 1
|align=center| 3:20
| Las Vegas, Nevada, United States
| 
|-
| Win
|align=center| 11–2
| Antoine Jaoude
| KO (punch)
| IFL: World Grand Prix Finals
| 
|align=center| 2
|align=center| 0:22
| Uncasville, Connecticut, United States
| 
|-
| Win
|align=center| 10–2
|Bryan Vetell
| TKO (punches)
| IFL: World Grand Prix Semifinals
| 
|align=center| 3
|align=center| 1:01
| Chicago, Illinois, United States
| 
|-
| Win
|align=center| 9–2
|Shane Ott
| Decision (unanimous)
| IFL: Las Vegas
| 
|align=center| 3
|align=center| 4:00
| Las Vegas, Nevada, United States
| 
|-
| Loss
|align=center| 8–2
| Ben Rothwell
| Decision (split)
| IFL: Moline
| 
|align=center| 3
|align=center| 4:00
| Moline, Illinois, United States
| 
|-
| Win
|align=center| 8–1
| Mario Rinaldi
| TKO (punches)
| BodogFIGHT: Costa Rica Combat
| 
|align=center| 1
|align=center| 2:38
| San José, Costa Rica
| 
|-
| Win
|align=center| 7–1
|Vince Lucero
| TKO (punches)
| IFL: Oakland
| 
|align=center| 1
|align=center| 1:55
| Oakland, California, United States
| 
|-
| Loss
|align=center| 6–1
| Josh Curran 
| Decision (unanimous) 
| BodogFIGHT: Clash of Nations
| 
|align=center| 3
|align=center| 5:00
| Saint Petersburg, Russia
| 
|-
| Win
|align=center| 6–0
|Jerome Smith
| Submission (arm-triangle choke)
| FightForce: Butte Brawl 2
| 
|align=center| 1
|align=center| 4:13
| Butte, Montana, United States
| 
|-
| Win
|align=center| 5–0
|Jason Godsey
| Submission (rear-naked choke)
| FightForce: Butte Brawl 1
| 
|align=center| 1
|align=center| 4:42
| Butte, Montana, United States
| 
|-
| Win
|align=center| 4–0
|Michael Buchkovich
| Submission (rear-naked choke)
| World Extreme Fighting 17
| 
|align=center| 1
|align=center| 0:56
| Las Vegas, Nevada, United States
| 
|-
| Win
|align=center| 3–0
|Ray Seraile
| TKO (submission to punches)
| PXC 3: Return of the Enforcer
| 
|align=center| 2
|align=center| 3:41
| Mangilao, Guam
| 
|-
| Win
|align=center| 2–0
|Jerry Vrbanovic
| Decision (split)
| rowspan=2|Rage on the River
| rowspan=2|
|align=center| 3
|align=center| 3:00
| rowspan=2|Redding, California, United States
| 
|-
| Win
|align=center| 1–0
|Bo Cantrell
| Submission (hammerlock)
|align=center| 3
|align=center| 2:52
|

Mixed martial arts exhibition record

| Win
|align=center| 3–0
|  James McSweeney
| TKO (punches)
| The Ultimate Fighter: Heavyweights
| 
|align=center| 1
|align=center| 4:13 
| Las Vegas, Nevada, United States
| 
|-
| Win
|align=center| 2–0
|  Justin Wren
| Decision (majority)
| The Ultimate Fighter: Heavyweights
| 
|align=center| 2
|align=center| 5:00
| Las Vegas, Nevada, United States
| 
|-
| Win
|align=center| 1–0
|  Kimbo Slice
| TKO (punches)
| The Ultimate Fighter: Heavyweights
| 
|align=center| 2
|align=center| 2:01
| Las Vegas, Nevada, United States
|

See also
 List of male mixed martial artists

References

External links
Roy Nelson's Official MMA Record
 Official website
Official UFC Profile
 

1976 births
Living people
American male mixed martial artists
American male sport wrestlers
Heavyweight mixed martial artists
American practitioners of Brazilian jiu-jitsu
American submission wrestlers
American wushu practitioners
American male boxers
People awarded a black belt in Brazilian jiu-jitsu
Sportspeople from the Las Vegas Valley
Mixed martial artists from Nevada
Mixed martial artists utilizing Shaolin Kung Fu
Mixed martial artists utilizing karate
Mixed martial artists utilizing boxing
Mixed martial artists utilizing Brazilian jiu-jitsu
The Ultimate Fighter winners
Ultimate Fighting Championship male fighters
Bellator male fighters